Pumas de la UNAH or simply Universidad was a Honduran football club.

History
They were formed to represent the Universidad Nacional Autonoma de Honduras. They merged with Broncos, forming Broncos de la UNAH, twice in 1982–83 and 2006–07 and meanwhile played in Choluteca those two seasons. They had initially taken over the Club Deportivo Atlético Español  franchise.

During their stay at first division as Pumas, they played in Comayagua. They were dissolved in August 2010 due to financial difficulties; the Universidad Pedagógica Nacional (UPN) took their place in the Liga de Ascenso.

Achievements
Liga Nacional
Runners-up (2): 1979–80, 1983–84

Segunda División
Winners (3): 1971–72, 1986, 1995–96

CONCACAF Champions' Cup
Runners-up (1): 1980

All-time league performance

 The 1972–73 season was canceled.
 On 1982–83 and 2006–07 Apertura & Clausura as Broncos UNAH.

International appearances
 CONCACAF Champions' Cup 1980

 CONCACAF Champions' Cup 1984

Coaches
 Alfonso Uclés (1979)
 Chelato Uclés (1983)
 Héctor Vargas (1997–1999)
 Gilberto Yearwood (1999–2000)
 Flavio Ortega (2000)
 Héctor Vargas (2000–2002)
 Héctor Vargas (2004–2005)

References

Universidad
1965 establishments in Honduras
2010 disestablishments in Honduras
Association football clubs established in 1965
Association football clubs disestablished in 2010